IRAS 19475+3119 is a protoplanetary nebula in the constellation of Cygnus, 15,000 light-years away.  The central star, V2513 Cygni, is an F-type post-AGB star.

The brightest portion of the nebula shows a quadrupolar structure, with elongated bipolar lobes, all surrounded by a faint halo.

The distance is essentially unknown. Assumptions about the luminosity have been used to estimate the distance and other stellar parameters. The star was originally at least  and is now . Estimates based on the oxygen spectral line strengths give much higher values luminosities with an absolute magnitude of at least −8.

The central star is variable, from about magnitude 9.33 to 9.50. A primary period of 41 days has been determined, but a slightly shorter secondary period leads to long beats causing variations in the amplitude and apparent period from year to year. The variations are caused by stellar pulsations, with the star being brightest when it is hottest.

References 

F-type supergiants
Post-asymptotic-giant-branch stars
Cygnus (constellation)
Protoplanetary nebulae
Cygni, V2513
Durchmusterung objects
331319
IRAS catalogue objects
Semiregular variable stars
TIC objects